Horatio Bardwell Cushman (August 13, 1820 – October 18, 1904) was an American historian. He is known for writing a History of the Choctaw, Chickasaw, and Natchez Indians. The book is well known source for Choctaw, Chickasaw, and Natchez Indian history.

Personal life

Cushman was born on August 13, 1820 in Oktibbeha County, Mississippi. He was the son of missionaries who worked at Mayhew, Mississippi. Cushman, as a child, witnessed the Choctaw Indians' removal from 1831 to 1833. During the American Civil War, Cushman served as a private in the 43rd Mississippi Infantry. After the War in 1868, Cushman moved to Texas near the Red River where the Choctaw Nation was found. In 1884, Cushman began writing his Choctaw and Chickasaw history. He spent six years researching for the book. It was first printed in 1899. He died on October 18, 1904 and was buried in Greenville, Texas.

Works

 1899. History of the Choctaw, Chickasaw, and Natchez Indians. Norman: University of Oklahoma.

See also

 Timothy H. Ball
 William Bartram
 Daniel Boone
 Cyrus Byington
 Angie Debo
 Henry S. Halbert
 Gideon Lincecum
 John R. Swanton

References

External links
 

Historians of Native Americans
1820 births
1904 deaths
People from Oktibbeha County, Mississippi
Confederate States Army soldiers